The University of West Florida College of Arts and Sciences (CAS) is the liberal arts college at the University of West Florida. It is the largest of UWF's three colleges.

Organization
Division of Anthropology and Archaeology
Department of Anthropology
Department of Archaeology
Florida Public Archaeology Network
School of Allied Health and Life Sciences
Department of Biology
Department of Clinical Laboratory Sciences
Department of Nursing
School of Fine and Performing Arts
Department of Art
Department of Music
Department of Theatre
School of Science and Engineering
Department of Computer Science
Department of Electrical and Computer Engineering
Department of Mathematics and Statistics
Department of Physics
Other departments and academic units:
Department of Chemistry
Department of Communication Arts
Department of English
Department of Environmental Studies
Department of Foreign Languages
Department of Government
Department of History
Department of Marine Biology
Department of Maritime Studies
Department of Philosophy
Department of Psychology
Interdisciplinary Studies
Student Success Programs
University Advising Center
University Honors Programs

External links
Official website

West Florida College of Arts and Sciences, University of
College of Arts and Sciences, University of West Florida